Liu Kwok Man (born 1 July 1978) is a football referee from Hong Kong who has been a full international referee for FIFA.

He also refereed at the regional league such as 2014 FIFA World Cup qualifiers. Sponsor Thai Premier League the big match Chonburi vs SCG Muangthong United, AFC Champions League, AFC Cup and 2012 AFC U-19 Championship.

AFC Asian Cup

References 

1978 births
Living people
Hong Kong football referees
AFC Asian Cup referees